The Simmental is an alpine valley in the Bernese Oberland of Switzerland. It expands from Lenk to Boltigen, in a more or less south-north direction (Obersimmental), and from there to the valley exit at Wimmis near Spiez it takes a west-east orientation (Niedersimmental). It comprises the municipalities of Lenk, St. Stephan, Zweisimmen, Boltigen, Oberwil, Därstetten, Erlenbach, Diemtigen and Wimmis. The Simme flows through the valley.

Some villages play a role in the winter tourism of the region of Bern, such as Lenk or Zweisimmen. From Zweisimmen the resorts of Gstaad and Château-d'Œx can be reached.

Further up is the Jaun Pass, which is crossed to go from Bulle to Fribourg, as well as the Hahnenmoos, which links Lenk with Adelboden.

References

Valleys of Switzerland
Bernese Oberland
Valleys of the Alps
Aare
Landforms of the canton of Bern